Darjazin-e Olya Rural District is a rural district (dehestan) in Qorveh-e Darjazin County, Hamadan Province, Iran. At the 2006 census, its population was 16,900, in 4,065 families. The rural district has 23 villages.

References 

Rural Districts of Hamadan Province
Razan County